The 1961–62 season was the 89th season of competitive football in Scotland and the 65th season of the Scottish Football League.

Scottish League Division One

Dundee had an excellent start to the season, including a 5–1 win away to Rangers, and having a seemingly invincible lead by Christmas. A poor
run of form in the new year, including a run of three successive defeats, allowed Rangers to move to the top of the table. Rangers themselves lost to
Dundee United and Aberdeen in the closing weeks, allowing Dundee to take the title with a 3–0 win at St Johnstone on the last day of the season.

Champions: Dundee
Relegated: St Johnstone, Stirling Albion

Scottish League Division Two

Promoted: Clyde, Queen of the South

Cup honours

Other honours

National

County

 – aggregate over two legs – replay

Highland League

Scotland national team

1962 British Home Championship – Winners

Key:
 (H) = Home match
 (A) = Away match
 WCQG8 = World Cup qualifying – Group 8
 WCQPO = World Cup qualifying – play-off match
 BHC = British Home Championship

Notes and references

External links
Scottish Football Historical Archive

 
Seasons in Scottish football